Crematogaster abstinens is a species of ant in tribe Crematogastrini. It was described by Forel in 1899.

References

abstinens
Insects described in 1899